is an autobahn spur in southwestern Germany, connecting Donaueschingen with Bad Dürrheim.

The A 864 was supposed to be a part of the planned A 86. The current Autobahn still retains its kilometer counter, which counts from 84 to 90.

Exit list 

  

|}

External links 

864
A864